This is a list of cemeteries in Lithuania.

Vilnius
Antakalnis Cemetery
Bernardine Cemetery
Evangelical Cemetery
Jewish cemeteries
Rasos Cemetery

Kaunas
Jewish cemeteries
Petrašiūnai Cemetery

Klaipėda
Senosios miesto kapinės
Joniškės kapinės
Lėbartų kapinės

Ukmergė
Siesikai Cemetery
Mikėnai Cemetery
Česonys Cemetery

Lithuania
 
Cemeteries